Kazimierz Rumsza (20 August 1886 - 1970) was a Polish general.

Biography
After military service in the Imperial Russian Army in World War I, where he reached the rank of a colonel, he joined the 1st Polish Corps of General Józef Dowbor-Muśnicki in western Russia from December 1917 until the Germans forced its dissolution in July 1918. 

He helped Walerian Czuma organise 1st Kosciuszko regiment at Samara in August 1918 which later formed the 5th Rifle Division in Siberia (sometimes known as the Polish Legion or the Siberian Division) which fought alongside the Czech Legion and the White movement in the Russian Civil War. When the White government of Admiral Aleksandr Kolchak collapsed in December 1919, the Polish Legion joined the general retreat along the Trans-Siberian Railway, until it was surrounded by the Red Army east of Krasnoyarsk in early January 1920. Refusing to surrender, Rumsza led 900 officers and men on an ice march through the taiga slipping through Bolshevik forces until they reached Irkutsk. From there they managed to escape to Harbin in White-controlled Manchuria, and thence to Vladivostok. Rumsza's force arrived at Gdańsk (Danzig) in Poland in June 1920 and volunteered to fight in the Polish-Soviet War which had just broken out.

Rumsza went on to command his reformed division and fought several battles with Red cavalry. He was awarded the Virtuti Militari Cross for his services in Russia.

During World War II he joined the pro-Allies Polish Armed Forces in the West. He died in exile in London in 1970 and was buried on the eastern side of Highgate Cemetery.

Honours and awards
 Silver Cross of the Virtuti Militari
 Cross of Independence
 Officer's Cross of the Order of Polonia Restituta
 Cross of Valour - four times

References 

1886 births
1970 deaths
Burials at Highgate Cemetery
Polish generals
Military personnel of the Russian Empire
Allied intervention in the Russian Civil War
Blue Army (Poland) personnel
Recipients of the Silver Cross of the Virtuti Militari
Recipients of the Cross of Independence
Officers of the Order of Polonia Restituta
Recipients of the Cross of Valour (Poland)